SMS Viribus Unitis  was an Austro-Hungarian dreadnought battleship, the first of the . "Viribus Unitis", meaning "With United Forces", was the personal motto of Emperor Franz Joseph I.

Viribus Unitis was ordered by the Austro-Hungarian Navy in 1908 and was laid down in Stabilimento Tecnico Triestino shipyard in Trieste on 24 July 1910. Viribus Unitis was launched from the shipyard on 24 June 1911 and was formally commissioned into the Austro-Hungarian Navy on 5 December 1912. She spent her early career performing training missions and making trips to foreign ports. In June 1914, she carried Archduke Franz Ferdinand on a trip to Bosnia with his wife Sophie. During his visit to Sarajevo, he was assassinated by Gavrilo Princip in the event that caused the beginning of World War I.

During World War I, Viribus Unitis took part in the flight of the German battlecruiser  and light cruiser . In May 1915, she also took part in the bombardment of the Italian port city of Ancona. Viribus Unitis was sunk while at anchor by limpet mines emplaced by Italian sailors on 1 November 1918.

Construction and design

Construction 
Viribus Unitis was ordered in 1908 as the first of a class of four, the first dreadnoughts to be built for the Austro-Hungarian Navy. Initially intended to be named Tegetthoff, she was renamed on the personal order of Emperor Franz Josef; following this, the second ship of the class was named Tegetthoff. The ship was laid down in the Stabilimento Tecnico Triestino shipyard in Trieste on 24 July 1910. Following eleven months of construction, Viribus Unitis was launched on 24 June 1911. Following her fitting out, she was commissioned into the Austro-Hungarian Navy on 5 December 1912.

Characteristics 

Viribus Unitis had four Parsons steam turbines, each of which was housed in a separate engine-room. The turbines were powered by twelve Babcock & Wilcox boilers. She carried  of coal, and an additional  of fuel oil that was to be sprayed on the coal to increase its burn rate.

Viribus Unitis mounted twelve  Škoda 30.5 cm K10 guns in four triple turrets. Her secondary armament consisted of a dozen  Škoda 15 cm K10 guns mounted in casemates amidships. Twelve  Škoda K10 guns were mounted on open pivot mounts on the upper deck, above the casemates. Three more 7 cm K10 guns were mounted on the upper turrets for anti-aircraft duties. Four  submerged torpedo tubes were fitted, one each in the bow, stern and on each broadside; twelve torpedoes were carried.

Service history

Archduke Franz Ferdinand's visit to Sarajevo 

Archduke Franz Ferdinand of Austria travelled aboard Viribus Unitis in late June 1914 en route to Bosnia to observe military manoeuvres. On 25 June, he boarded the ship in Trieste Harbour and travelled to the mouth of the Neretva River, where he transferred to another vessel. On 30 June, two days after Ferdinand and his wife were assassinated by Gavrilo Princip in the Bosnian city of Sarajevo, Viribus Unitis transported their bodies back to Trieste.

World War I 

Prior to the war, Viribus Unitis was assigned to the 1st Battleship Division of Austro-Hungarian Navy. During World War I, the battleship saw limited service due to the Otranto Barrage which prohibited Austro-Hungarian battleships from leaving the Adriatic sea. As a result, she hardly ever left Pola.

The two German ships were stationed in the Mediterranean and were attempting to break out of the strait of Messina, which was surrounded by enemy troops and vessels and make their way to Turkey. After the Germans successfully broke out of Messina, the navy was recalled. The fleet had by that time advanced as far south as Brindisi in south eastern Italy. Viribus Unitis also participated in the bombardment of the Italian city of Ancona in May 1915. Following these operations Viribus Unitis remained in Pola for most of the remainder of the war.

Her tenure in Pola was livened up by a visit from the new Emperor Charles I on 15 December 1916 and another by Kaiser Wilhelm II on 12 December 1917 during his inspection of the German submarine base there. The Italians conducted eighty air raids on Pola between 1915 and 1917.

The Otranto Raid 

By 1918, the new commander of the Austrian fleet, Konteradmiral Miklós Horthy, decided to conduct another attack on the Otranto Barrage to allow more German and Austro-Hungarian U-boats to safely get through the heavily defended strait. During the night of 8 June, Horthy left the naval base of Pola with Viribus Unitis and Prinz Eugen. The other two dreadnoughts,  and Tegetthoff, along with one destroyer and six torpedo boats departed Pola on 9 June. At about 3:15 on the morning of 10 June, two Italian MAS boats, MAS 15 and MAS 21, spotted the Austrian fleet. The MAS platoon was commanded by Capitano di fregata Luigi Rizzo while the individual boats were commanded by Capo timoniere Armando Gori and Guardiamarina di complemento Giuseppe Aonzo respectively. Both boats successfully penetrated the escort screen and split to engage each of the dreadnoughts. MAS 21 attacked Tegetthoff, but her torpedoes failed. MAS 15 managed to hit Szent István with her torpedoes at about 3:25 am. Both boats were then chased away from the scene by the Austrian escort vessels.

Despite attempts to take the crippled Szent István into tow by Tegetthoff, the ship continued to sink and the attempt was abandoned. A few minutes after 6:00 am Szent István sank. Admiral Horthy, commander of the proposed attack, soon canceled the attack because he thought that the Italians had discovered his plan and ordered the ships to return to Pola. On the contrary, the Italians did not even discover that the Austrian dreadnoughts had departed Pola until later on 10 June when aerial reconnaissance photos revealed that they were no longer there. This was the last military operation that the Viribus Unitis was to take part in and she spent the rest of her career at port in Pola.

Italian attack and sinking 
By October 1918 it had become clear that Austria-Hungary was facing defeat in the war. The Austrian government decided to give Viribus Unitis, along with much of the fleet, to the newly formed State of Slovenes, Croats and Serbs. This was considered preferential to handing the fleet to the Allies, as the new state had declared its neutrality. The transfer to the State of Slovenes, Croats and Serbs took place in the evening of 31 October, and Viribus Unitis was renamed Jugoslavija.

On 1 November 1918, two men of the Italian Navy, Raffaele Paolucci and Raffaele Rossetti, rode a primitive manned torpedo (nicknamed Mignatta or "leech") into the Austro-Hungarian naval base at Pola. They had sailed from an Italian port some time before, and were unaware of the transfer of the Austro-Hungarian fleet the previous day.

Travelling down the rows of Austrian battleships, the two men encountered Jugoslavija at around 4:40 am. Rossetti placed one canister of TNT on the hull of the battleship, timed to explode at 6:30 am. He then flooded the second canister, sinking it on the harbour floor close to the ship. The men had no breathing sets, and therefore had to keep their heads above water. They were discovered and taken prisoner just after placing the explosives under the battleship's hull. Taken aboard Jugoslavija, they informed the new captain of the battleship of what they had done but did not reveal the exact position of the explosives. The explosion did not happen at 6:30 as predicted and Vuković returned to the ship with many sailors, mistakenly believing that the Italians had lied. The mines exploded at 6:44, sinking Jugoslavija in 15 minutes. Vuković and 300–400 of her crew were killed in the sinking. The explosion of the second canister also sank the Austrian freighter Wien.

Paolucci and Rossetti were interned until the end of the war a few days later, and were honoured by the Kingdom of Italy with the Gold Medal of Military Valor.

Commemorations 

SMS Viribus Unitis was selected as the main motif of a high value collectors' coin: the Austrian SMS Viribus Unitis commemorative coin, minted on 13 September 2006. The obverse side shows the flagship Viribus Unitis as seen from the deck of an accompanying ship in the fleet. Two other ships of an older class can be seen in the background. The reverse of the coin is a tribute to the old Austro-Hungarian Imperial Navy, showing SMS Viribus Unitis from a front angle. A naval biplane circles overhead and a submarine surfaces in the foreground. The coin commemorates not only the ship Viribus Unitis, but also the three main arms of the Austro-Hungarian Navy in the First World War. The coin was the last of the series "Austria on the High Seas".

There is a cutaway model of Viribus Unitis in the Museum of Military History in Vienna. The model is at a scale of 1:25 and has a total length of 6 metres. It was built between 1913 and 1917 by eight craftsmen of the shipyard Stabilimento Tecnico Triestino..

Her bow is on display at the Venetian Arsenal.

References

Explanatory notes

Citations

Bibliography

External links 

 Photos and comments (in Italian) on the Viribus Unitis sinking
 Tegetthoff-class dreadnoughts
 Austro-Hungarian Navy
 3D images
 Image of its launch

Tegetthoff-class battleships
Ships built in Trieste
1911 ships
World War I battleships of Austria-Hungary
Maritime incidents in 1918
World War I shipwrecks in the Adriatic Sea